This is a select bibliography of post World War II English language books (including translations) and journal articles about the history of Russia and its empire from 1613 until 1917. It specifically excludes topics related to the Russian Revolution; see Bibliography of the Russian Revolution and Civil War for information on these subjects.
Book entries may have references to reviews published in academic journals or major newspapers when these could be considered helpful.

A brief selection of English translations of primary sources is included. The sections "General Surveys" and "Biographies" contain books; other sections contain both books and journal articles. Book entries have references to journal articles and reviews about them when helpful. Additional bibliographies can be found in many of the book-length works listed below; see Further Reading for several book and chapter-length bibliographies. The External Links section contains entries for publicly available select bibliographies from universities.

Inclusion criteria
Works included are referenced in the notes or bibliographies of scholarly secondary sources or journals. Included works should either be published by an academic or widely distributed publisher, be authored by a notable subject matter expert as shown by scholarly reviews and have significant scholarly journal reviews about the work. To keep the bibliography length manageable, only items that clearly meet the criteria should be included.

Citation style
This bibliography uses APA style citations. Entries do not use templates. References to reviews and notes for entries do use citation templates. Where books which are only partially related to Russian history are listed, the titles for chapters or sections should be indicated if possible, meaningful, and not excessive.

If a work has been translated into English, the translator should be included and a footnote with appropriate bibliographic information for the original language version should be included.

When listing works with titles or names published with alternative English spellings, the form used in the latest published version should be used and the version and relevant bibliographic information noted if it previously was published or reviewed under a different title.

General works

Period works

 Anisimov, E. V. (2004). Five Empresses: Court Life in Eighteenth-Century Russia. New York: Praeger.
 Baron, S. (1988). The Jews under Tsars and Soviets. New York: Schocken Books.
 Beer, D. (2016). The House of the Dead: Siberian Exile Under the Tsars. London: Vintage.
 Dowler, W. (2010). Russia in 1913. DeKalb: DeKalb: Northern Illinois University Press.
 Erickson, M., & Erickson L. (Eds.). (2005). Russia: War, Peace and Diplomacy: Essays in Honour of John Erickson. London: Weidenfeld & Nicolson.
 Fuller, Jr. W. C. (1992). Strategy and Power in Russia, 1600–1914. New York: Free Press.
 Hellie, R. (2005). The Structure of Russian Imperial History. History and Theory, 44(4), 88–112.
 Hosking, G. (1997). Russia: People and Empire, 1552–1917. Cambridge: Harvard University Press.
 Hughes, L. (2008). The Romanovs: Ruling Russia 1613–1917. New York: Bloomsbury.
 Khodarkovsky, M. Of Christianity, Enlightenment, and Colonialism: Russia in the North Caucasus, 1500–1800. Journal of Modern History, 71(1999), 394–430.
 Kleimola, A. M. (1979). Up Through Servitude: The Changing Condition of the Muscovite Elite in the Sixteenth and Seventeenth Centuries. Russian History, 6(2), 210–229.
 LeDonne, J. P. (1991). Absolutism and Ruling Class: The Formation of the Russian Political Order, 1700–1825. Oxford: Oxford University Press.
 Lieven, D. (1989). Russia’s Rulers under the Old Regime. New Haven: Yale University Press.
 Lincoln, W. B. (1997). Between Heaven and Hell: The Story of a Thousand Years of Artistic Life in Russia. New York: Viking.
 Lincoln, W. B. (1981). The Romanovs: Autocrats of All the Russias. New York: Doubleday.
 Lincoln, W. B. (2001). Sunlight at Midnight: St Petersburg and the Rise of Modern Russia. Oxford: Oxford University Press.
 Mironov, B. N., & Eklof, B. (2000). The Social History of Imperial Russia, 1700–1917 (2 vols.). , Oxfordshire, UK: Westview Press.
 Montefiore, S. (2017). Romanovs: 1613–1918, New York: Vintage.
 Seton-Watson, H. (1967). The Russian Empire 1801–1917 (Oxford History of Modern Europe). Oxford: Oxford University Press.
 Weeks, T. R. (1996). Nation and State in Late Imperial Russia: Nationalism and Russification on the Western Frontier, 1863-1914. DeKalb: Northern Illinois University Press.
 Williams, B. (2021). Late Tsarist Russia, 1881–1913 (Routledge Studies in the History of Russian and Eastern Europe). New York: Routledge.

Topical works
 Alexander, J. T. (1969). Autocratic Politics in a National Crisis: The Imperial Russian Government and Pugachev’s Revolt 1773–1775. Bloomington: Indiana University Press.
 Anisimov, E. V. (1993). The Reforms of Peter the Great: Progress through Coercion in Russia. New York: Routledge.
 Ascher, A. P. A. (2001). Stolypin: The Search for Stability in Late Imperial Russia. Stanford: Stanford University Press.
 Beer, D. (2013). Decembrists, Rebels, and Martyrs in Siberian Exile: The “Zerentui Conspiracy” of 1828 and the Fashioning of a Revolutionary Genealogy. Slavic Review, 72(3), 528–551.
 Crummey, R. O. (1983). Aristocrats and Servitors: The Boyar Elite, 1613–89. Princeton: Princeton University Press.
 Daly, J. W. (1997). Autocracy under Siege: Security Police and Opposition in Russia 1866–1905. DeKalb: Northern Illinois University Press.
 Daly, J. W. (2004). The Watchful State 1906–17: Security Police and Opposition in Russia. DeKalb: Northern Illinois University Press.
 Dunning, C. S. L. (2001). Russia’s First Civil War: The Time of Troubles and the Founding of the Romanov Dynasty. University Park, PA: Penn State University Press.
 Eklof, B. Bushnell, J., & Zakharova, L. (Eds.). (1994). Russia’s Great Reforms, 1855–1881. Bloomington: Indiana University Press.
 Emmons, T. (2014). The Formation of Political Parties and the First National Elections in Russia. Cambridge, MA: Harvard University Press.
 Fuller, Jr. W. C. (2006). The Foe Within: Fantasies of Treason and the End of Imperial Russia. Ithaca: Cornell University Press.
 Hughes, L. (1997). Russia in the Age of Peter the Great. New Haven: Yale University Press.
 Kates, G. (2001). Monsieur d’Eon is a Woman: A Tale of Political Intrigue and Sexual Masquerade. New York: Basic Books.
 Kelly, L. (2006). Diplomacy and Murder in Tehran: Alexander Griboyedov and Imperial Russia’s Mission to the Shah of Persia. New York: I.B. Tauris.
 Kleimola, A. (1979). Up Through Servitude: The Changing Condition of the Muscovite Elite in the Sixteenth and Seventeenth Centuries. Russian History, 6(2), 210–229.
 LeDonne, J. P. (1984). Ruling Russia: Politics and Administration in the Age of Absolutism 1762–96. Princeton: Princeton University Press.
 Levin, E. (2014). A Child of Christian Blood: Murder and Conspiracy in Tsarist Russia: The Beilis Blood Libel. New York: Knopf Doubleday/Schocken Books.
 Lewitter, L. (1958). Peter the Great, Poland, and the Westernization of Russia. Journal of the History of Ideas, 19(4), 493–506. 
 Lincoln, W. B. (1990). The Great Reforms: Autocracy, Bureaucracy, and the Politics of Change in Imperial Russia. DeKalb: Northern Illinois University Press.
 Lincoln, W. B. (1982). In the Vanguard of Reform: Russia’s Enlightened Bureaucrats. DeKalb: Northern Illinois University Press.
 Lincoln, W. B. (1983). In War’s Dark Shadow: The Russians before the Great War. DeKalb: Northern Illinois University Press.
 McDonald, E., & McDonald, D. (2011). Fanny Lear: Love and Scandal in Tsarist Russia. Bloomington: Indiana University Press.
 Madariaga, I. de, (1981). Russia in the Age of Catherine the Great. New Haven: Yale University Press.
 Manning, R. (1982). The Crisis of the Old Order in Russia: Gentry and Government. Princeton: Princeton University Press.
 Mazour, R. J. (1937). The First Russian Revolution, 1825: The Decembrist Movement, its Origins, Development, and Significance . Berkeley: University of California Press.
 Merridale, C. (2013). Red Fortress: The Secret Heart of Russia’s History. London: Penguin.
 Perrie, M. (2002). Pretenders and Popular Monarchism in Early Modern Russia: The False Tsars of the Time of Troubles. Cambridge: Cambridge University Press.
 Pflaum, R. (1968). The Emperor’s Talisman: The Life of the Duc de Morny. New York: Meredith Press.
 Ransel, D. L. (1975). The Politics of Catherinian Russia: The Panin Party. New Haven: Yale University Press.
 Saul, N. E. (1970). Russia and the Mediterranean, 1797–1807. Chicago: University of Chicago Press.
 Sumner, B. H. (1962). Russia and the Balkans 1870–1880. Hamden: Archon Books.
 Tairova-Yakovleva, T. (2020). Ivan Mazepa and the Russian Empire. Translated by J. Surer. Peter Jacyk Centre for Ukrainian Historical Research Monograph Series, vol. 11. Montreal: McGill-Queen's University Press, 2020.
 Venturi, F. (1960). Roots of Revolution: A History of the Populist and Socialist Movements in Nineteenth Century Russia (F. Haskell, Trans.). New York: Alfred A. Knopf.
 Vitale, S. (1997). Pushkin’s Button. New York: Farrar Straus & Giroux.
 Walicki, A. (1975). The Slavophile Controversy: History of a Conservative Utopia in Nineteenth-century Russian Thought. (H. Andrews-Rusiecka, Trans.) Oxford: Oxford University Press.

Fall of the Romanovs

 King, G., & Wilson, P. (2005). The Fate of the Romanovs. Hoboken: Wiley.
 Rappaport, H. (2008). Ekaterinburg: The Last Days of the Romanovs. London: St Martins Press.
 Steinberg, M. D., & Khrustalëv, V. M. (1997). The Fall of the Romanovs. New Haven: Yale University Press.

Economics
 Gatrell, P. and Lewis, R. (1992). Russian and Soviet Economic History. The Economic History Review, 45(4), :743-754. 
 Gregg, A. G. and Rogers, D. (2022). Introduction: The Imperial Russian Corporation in and beyond Economic History. The Russian Review, 81(3), :407-420.
 Kahan, A. (1985). Plow, the Hammer, and the Knout: An Economic History of Eighteenth-Century Russia. Chicago: University of Chicago Press.
 Kahan, A. (1989). Russian Economic History: The Nineteenth Century. Chicago: University Of Chicago Press.
 Marzec, W., & Turunen, R. (2018). Socialisms in the Tsarist Borderlands: Poland and Finland in a Contrastive Comparison, 1830–1907. Contributions to the History of Concepts, 13(1), 22–50.

Empire

 Baumann, R. F. (1987). Subject Nationalities in the Military Service of Imperial Russia: The Case of the Bashkirs. Slavic Review, 46(3/4), 489–502. 
 Becker, S. (2004). Russia’s Protectorates in Central Asia: Bukhara and Khiva, 1865–1924. London: Routledge.
 Bilenky, S. (2018). Imperial Urbanism in the Borderlands: Kyiv, 1800-1905 (Illustrated edition). Toronto: University of Toronto Press.
 Bobroff, R. P. (2006). Roads to Glory: Late Imperial Russia and the Turkish Straits. London: I.B.Tauris.
 Figes, O. (2010). Crimea. London: Metropolitan Books.
 Fisher, A. W. (1970). The Russian Annexation of the Crimea 1772–1783. Cambridge: Cambridge University Press.
 Friesen, A. E. (2020). Colonizing Russia's Promised Land: Orthodoxy and Community on the Siberian Steppe. Toronto: University of Toronto Press.
 Gammer, M. (1994). Muslim Resistance to the Tsar: Shamil and the Conquest of Chechnia and Daghestan. London: Routledge.
 Geyer, D. (1987). Russian Imperialism: The Interaction of Domestic and Foreign Policy 1860–1914. New Haven: Yale University Press.
 Heuman, S. (1998). Kistiakovsky: The Struggle for National and Constitutional Rights in the Last Years of Tsarism (Harvard Series In Ukrainian Studies). Cambridge: Harvard Ukrainian Research Institute.
 Hosking, G. (1997). Russia: People and Empire, 1552–1917. Cambridge: Harvard University Press.
 Kappeler, A. (2001). The Russian Empire: A Multiethnic History (A. Clayton, trans.). Harlow: Longman.
 Keller, S. (2020). Russia and Central Asia: Coexistence, Conquest, Convergence. Toronto: University of Toronto Press.
 Khalid, A. (2021). Central Asia: A New History from the Imperial Conquests to the Present. Princeton: Princeton University Press.
 Khodarkovsky, M. (1992). Where Two Worlds Met: The Russian State and the Kalmyk Nomads, 1600–1771. Ithaca: Cornell University Press.
 Khodarkovsky, M. (2002). Russia’s Steppe Frontier: The Making of a Colonial Empire, 1500–1800. Bloomington: Indiana University Press.
 Kirmse, S. B. (2020). The Lawful Empire: Legal Change and Cultural Diversity in Late Tsarist Russia. Cambridge: Cambridge University Press.
 Knight, N. (2000). Grigor’ev in Orenburg, 1851-1862: Russian Orientalism in the Service of Empire? Slavic Review, 59(1), 74–100. 
 Kohut, Z. E. (1989). Russian Centralism and Ukrainian Autonomy: Imperial Absorption of the Hetmanate, 1760s–1830s (Harvard Series In Ukrainian Studies). Cambridge: Harvard Ukrainian Research Institute.
 LeDonne, J. P. (1997). The Russian Empire and the World 1700–1917: The Geopolitics of Expansion and Containment, Oxford: Oxford University Press.
 LeDonne, J. P. (2020) Forging a Unitary State: Russia's Management of the Eurasian Space, 1650–1850. Toronto: University of Toronto Press.
 Marzec, W., & Turunen, R. (2018). Socialisms in the Tsarist Borderlands: Poland and Finland in a Contrastive Comparison, 1830–1907. Contributions to the History of Concepts, 13(1), 22–50. 
 Miller, A. (2015). The Romanov Empire and the Russian Nation. In A. Miller & S. Berger (Eds.), Nationalizing Empires (pp. 309–368). Central European University Press. 
 Miller, C. (2021). We Shall Be Masters: Russian Pivots to East Asia from Peter the Great to Putin. Cambridge: Harvard University Press.
 Morrison, A., Drieu, C., & Chokobaeva, A. (Eds.). (2020). The Central Asian Revolt of 1916: A Collapsing Empire in the Age of War and Revolution. Manchester: Manchester University Press.
 Morrison, A. (2021). The Russian Conquest of Central Asia: A Study in Imperial Expansion, 1814–1914. Cambridge: Cambridge University Press.
 Mosse, W. E. (1963). The Rise and Fall of the Crimean System 1855–71: The Story of a Peace Settlement. New York: Macmillan.
 O’Neill, K. (2017). Claiming Crimea: A History of Catherine the Great’s Southern Empire. New Haven: Yale University Press.
 Riegg, S. B. (2020). Russia's Entangled Embrace: The Tsarist Empire and the Armenians, 1801–1914. Ithaca: Cornell University Press, Ithaca.
 Rywkin, M. (ed.). (1988). Russian Colonial Expansion to 1917. London: Mansell Publishing.
 Sabol, S. (2017). “The Touch of Civilization”: Comparing American and Russian Internal Colonization. University Press of Colorado. 
 Sunderland, W. (2000). The “Colonization Question”: Visions of Colonization in Late Imperial Russia. Jahrbücher Für Geschichte Osteuropas, 48(2), 210–232. 
 Staliūnas, D. (2007). Between Russification and Divide and Rule: Russian Nationality Policy in the Western Borderlands in mid-19th Century. Jahrbücher Für Geschichte Osteuropas, 55(3), 357–373.
 Staliūnas, D., & Aoshima, Y., (eds.). (2021). The Tsar, the Empire, and the Nation: Dilemmas of Nationalization in Russia's Western Borderlands, 1905–1915. Historical Studies in Eastern Europe and Eurasia. Budapest: Central European University Press.
 Steller, G. W. (2020). Eastbound through Siberia: Observations from the Great Northern Expedition'''. (Translated and annotated by M. A. Engel and K. E. Willmore). Bloomington: Indiana University Press.
 Subtelny, O. (1980). Russia and the Ukraine: The Difference That Peter I Made. The Russian Review, 39(1), 1–17. 
 Subtelny, O. (2008). Ukraine: A History (4th ed.). Toronto: University of Toronto Press.
 Tolz, V. (2005). Orientalism, Nationalism, and Ethnic Diversity in Late Imperial Russia. The Historical Journal, 48(1), 127–150. 
 Velychenko, S. (1997). Empire Loyalism and Minority Nationalism in Great Britain and Imperial Russia, 1707 to 1914: Institutions, Law, and Nationality in Scotland and Ukraine. Comparative Studies in Society and History, 39(3), 413–441. 
 Vitarbo, G. (2007). Nationality Policy and the Russian Imperial Officer Corps, 1905-1914. Slavic Review, 66(4), 682–701. 
 Weeks, T. R. (1996). Nation and State in Late Imperial Russia: Nationalism and Russification on the Western Frontier, 1863-1914. DeKalb: Northern Illinois University Press.
 Weeks, T. R. (2001). Russification and the Lithuanians, 1863-1905. Slavic Review, 60(1), 96–114. 
Indigenous peoples and ethnic groups
 Kappeler, A., Kohut, Z. E., Sysyn, F. E., & von Hagen, M. (Eds.). (2003). Culture, nation, and identity: the Ukrainian-Russian encounter, 1600–1945. Toronto: Canadian Institute of Ukrainian Studies Press.

Violence and terror
 Penkower, M. N. (2004). The Kishinev Pogrom of 1903: A Turning Point in Jewish History. Modern Judaism, 24(3), 187–225. 

Religion and philosophy

 Adams, A. S., & Shevzov, V. (Eds.). (2018). Framing Mary: The Mother of God in Modern, Revolutionary, and Post-Soviet Russian Culture (NIU Series in Slavic, East European, and Eurasian Studies). DeKalb: Northern Illinois University Press.
 Bakhmetyeva, T. (2017). Mother of the Church: Sofia Svechina, the Salon, and the Politics of Catholicism in Nineteenth-Century Russia and France (NIU Series in Slavic, East European, and Eurasian Studies). DeKalb: Northern Illinois University Press.
 Baron, S. (1988). The Jews under Tsars and Soviets. New York: Schocken Books.
 Cronin, G. (2021). Disenchanted Wanderer: The Apocalyptic Vision of Konstantin Leontiev. DeKalb: Northern Illinois University Press.
 Givens, J. (2018). The Image of Christ in Russian Literature: Dostoevsky, Tolstoy, Bulgakov, Pasternak (NIU Series in Slavic, East European, and Eurasian Studies). DeKalb: Northern Illinois University Press.
 Ivanov, A. A. (2020). A Spiritual Revolution: The Impact of Reformation and Enlightenment in Orthodox Russia. Madison: University of Wisconsin Press.
 Kivelson, V. A., & Worobec, C. D. (Eds.). (2020). Witchcraft in Russia and Ukraine, 1000–1900: A Sourcebook (NIU Series in Slavic, East European, and Eurasian Studies). DeKalb: Northern Illinois University Press.
 Kizenko, N. (2021). Good for the Souls: A History of Confession in the Russian Empire. Oxford Studies in Modern European History. New York: Oxford University Press.
 Mannherz, J. (2012). Modern Occultism in Late Imperial Russia (NIU Series in Slavic, East European, and Eurasian Studies). DeKalb: Northern Illinois University Press.
 Rosenthal, B. G. (Ed.). (1997). The Occult in Russian and Soviet Culture. New York: Cornell University Press.
 Sartori, P., & Ross, D. (eds.). (2020) Sharia in the Russian Empire: The Reach and Limits of Islamic Law in Central Eurasia, 1500–1900. Edinburgh: Edinburgh University Press.
 Smith, D. (1995). Freemasonry and the Public in Eighteenth-Century Russia. Eighteenth-Century Studies, 29(1), 25–44. 
 Tsyrempilov, N. (2021). Under the Shadow of White Tara: Buriat Buddhists in Imperial Russia. Leiden: Brill Schöningh.
 Walicki, A. (1977). Russian Social Thought: An Introduction to the Intellectual History of Nineteenth-Century Russia. The Russian Review, 36(1), 1–45. 
 Worobec, C. D. (1995). Witchcraft Beliefs and Practices in Prerevolutionary Russian and Ukrainian Villages. The Russian Review, 54(2), 165–187.
 Zitser, E. A. (2004). The Transfigured Kingdom: Sacred Parody and Charismatic Authority at the Court of Peter the Great. Ithaca: Cornell University Press.

Women and family
 Engel, B. A. (2021). Marriage, Household, and Home in Modern Russia from Peter the Great to Vladimir Putin (The Bloomsbury History of Modern Russia Series). London and New York: Bloomsbury Academic.
 Friedman, R. (2020). Modernity, Domesticity and Temporality in Russia: Time at Home. London: Bloomsbury.
 Ilic, M. (Ed.). (2017). The Palgrave Handbook of Women and Gender in Twentieth-Century Russia and the Soviet Union. Palgrave Macmillan.
 Kates, G. (2001). Monsieur d’Eon is a Woman: A Tale of Political Intrigue and Sexual Masquerade. New York: Basic Books.
 Marrese, M. L. (2002). A Woman's Kingdom: Noblewomen and the Control of Property in Russia, 1700–1861. Ithaca: Cornell University Press.
 Martin, R. E. (2012). A Bride for the Tsar: Brideshows and Marriage Politics in Early Modern Russia. DeKalb: Northern Illinois University Press.
 McDonald, E., & McDonald, D. (2011). Fanny Lear: Love and Scandal in Tsarist Russia, Bloomington: Indiana University Press.

Culture
 Brooks, J. (2010). The Russian Nation Imagined: The Peoples Of Russia As Seen In Popular Imagery, 1860s-1890s. Journal of Social History, 43(3), 535–557. 
 Brunson, M. (2016). Russian Realisms: Literature and Painting, 1840–1890 (NIU Series in Slavic, East European, and Eurasian Studies). DeKalb: Northern Illinois University Press.
 Chrissidis, N. A. (2016). An Academy at the Court of the Tsars: Greek Scholars and Jesuit Education in Early Modern Russia. DeKalb: Northern Illinois University Press.
 Cracraft, J. (1988). The Petrine Revolution in Russian Architecture. Chicago: University of Chicago Press.
 Cracraft, J. (1997). The Petrine Revolution in Russian Imagery. Chicago University of Chicago Press.
 Cracraft, J. (2004). The Petrine Revolution in Russian Culture. Cambridge, MA: Belknap Press.
 Dianina, K. (2012). When Art Makes News: Writing Culture and Identity in Imperial Russia. DeKalb: Northern Illinois University Press.
 Grigoryan, B. (2018). Noble Subjects: The Russian Novel and the Gentry, 1762–1861 (NIU Series in Slavic, East European, and Eurasian Studies). DeKalb: Northern Illinois University Press.
 Jensen, C., Maier, I., & Shamin, S. (2021). Russia's Theatrical Past: Court Entertainment in the Seventeenth Century. Bloomington: Indiana University Press.
 Kleespies, I. A. (2012). A Nation Astray: Nomadism and National Identity in Russian Literature (NIU Series in Slavic, East European, and Eurasian Studies). DeKalb: Northern Illinois University Press.
 Knight, N. (2022). Why Did Nadezhdin Publish Chaadaev? Interests vs. Ideas in the Literary Politics of the 1830s. The Russian Review, 81(2) 209-225.
 Levitt, M. C. (2011). The Visual Dominant in Eighteenth-Century Russia (NIU Series in Slavic, East European, and Eurasian Studies). DeKalb: Northern Illinois University Press.
 Lucey, C. (2021). Love for Sale: Representing Prostitution in Imperial Russia (NIU Series in Slavic, East European, and Eurasian Studies). DeKalb: Northern Illinois University Press.
 Lyssakov, P., & Norris, S. M., (eds.). (2020) The City in Russian Culture (Routledge Contemporary Russia and Eastern Europe series). New York: Routledge.
 Natan M. M. (2006). Jews, Ukrainians, and Russians in Kiev: Intergroup Relations in Late Imperial Associational Life. Slavic Review, 65(3), 475–501.
 Ritzarev, M. (2006). Eighteenth-Century Russian Music. London: Routledge.
 Rowland, D. B. (2020). God, Tsar, and People: The Political Culture of Early Modern Russia (NIU Series in Slavic, East European, and Eurasian Studies). Ithaca: Cornell University Press.
 Shkandrij, M. (2001). Russia and Ukraine: Literature and the Discourse of Empire from Napoleonic to Postcolonial Times. Montreal & Kingston: McGill-Queen's Press.
 Smith, A. K. (2021). Cabbage and Caviar: A History of Food in Russia'. London: Reaktion Books.
 Stites, R. (1983). Prostitute and Society in Pre-Revolutionary Russia. Jahrbücher Für Geschichte Osteuropas, 31(3), 348–364. 
 Wirtschafter, E. Kimer. (2015). Social Identity in Imperial Russia. Cornell University Press. 
 Wortman, R. S. (2006). Scenarios of Power: Myth and Ceremony in Russian Monarchy. Princeton: Princeton University Press.

Foreign Relations
 Bovykin, V. I., & Spring, D. W. (1979). The Franco–Russian Alliance. History, 64(210), 20–35. 
 Farrow, L. A. (2021). The Catacazy Affair and the Uneasy Path of Russian-American Relations (Library of Modern Russia). New York: Bloomsbury Publishing.
 Kaminski, A. S. (1993). Republic vs. Autocracy Poland-Lithuania and Russia 1686-1697 (Harvard Series In Ukrainian Studies). Cambridge: Harvard Ukrainian Research Institute.
 Spring, D. W. (1988). Russia and the Franco-Russian Alliance, 1905-14: Dependence or Interdependence? The Slavonic and East European Review, 66(4), 564–592.

Other
 Adams, B. F. (2019). The Politics of Punishment: Prison Reform in Russia, 1863–1917 (NIU Series in Slavic, East European, and Eurasian Studies). DeKalb: Northern Illinois University Press.
 Bujalski, N. (2022). "Tuk, tuk, tuk!" A History of Russia's Prison Knocking Language. The Russian Review, 81(3), :491-510.
 Cross, A. C. (1997). By the Banks of the Neva: Chapters from the Lives and Careers of the British in Eighteenth-Century Russia. Cambridge: Cambridge University Press.
 Danylenko, A. (2017). The “Doubling of Hallelujah” for the “Bastard Tongue”: The Ukrainian Language Question in Russian Ukraine, 1905-1916. Harvard Ukrainian Studies, 35(1/4), 59–86. 
 Erley, M. (2021). On Russian Soil: Myth and Materiality. DeKalb: Northern Illinois University Press.
 Hartley, J. M. (2021). The Volga: A History. New Haven: Yale University Press.
 Herlihy, P. (1991). Odessa: A History, 1794–1914 (Harvard Series In Ukrainian Studies). Cambridge: Harvard Ukrainian Research Institute.
 King, G. (2006). The Court of the Last Tsar: Pomp, Power and Pageantry in the Reign of Nicholas II. Hoboken: Wiley.
 Lounsbery, A. (2019). Life Is Elsewhere: Symbolic Geography in the Russian Provinces, 1800–1917 (NIU Series in Slavic, East European, and Eurasian Studies). DeKalb: Northern Illinois University Press.
 Raeff, M. (1983). The Well-Ordered Police State: Social and Institutional Change Through Law in the Germanies and Russia, 1600–1800. New Haven: Yale University Press.
 Tatsumi, Y., and Tsurumi, T. (Eds.). (2020). Publishing in Tsarist Russia: A History of Print Media from Enlightenment to Revolution (Library of Modern Russia). New York: Bloomsbury Academic.
 Weeks, T. R. (1996). Nation and State in Late Imperial Russia: Nationalism and Russification on the Western Frontier, 1863-1914. DeKalb: Northern Illinois University Press.

Military and conflicts
 Blanch, L. (1960). The Sabres of Paradise: Conquest and Vengeance in the Caucasus. New York: Viking Press.
 Donnelly, A. (1968). The Russian Conquest of Bashkiria 1552–1740. Yale University.
 Duffy, C. (1981). Russia’s Military Way to the West: Origins and Nature of Russian Military Power 1700–1800. London: Routledge.
 Englund, P. (2012). The Battle That Shook Europe: Poltava and the Birth of the Russian Empire. London: I.B. Tauris.
 Frost, R. I., (2000). The Northern Wars, 1558–1721. London: Longman.
 Gatrell, P. (2010). Government, Industry and Rearmament in Russia, 1900-1914: The Last Argument of Tsarism (Cambridge Russian, Soviet and Post-Soviet Studies). Cambridge: Cambridge University Press.
 Marshall, A. (2006). Russian General Staff 1860–1917. London: Routledge.
 Menning, B. (1992). Bayonets before Bullets: The Imperial Russian Army, 1861–1914. Bloomington: Indian University Press.
 Perdue, P. C. (1996). Military Mobilization in Seventeenth and Eighteenth-Century China, Russia, and Mongolia. Modern Asian Studies, 30(4), 757–793. 
 Rich, D. A. (1997). The Tsar’s Colonels: Professionalism, Strategy, and Subversion in Late Imperial Russia. Cambridge, MA: Harvard University Press.
 Schönle, A. (2001). Garden of the Empire: Catherine's Appropriation of the Crimea. Slavic Review, 60(1), 1-23.

Russia and Napoleon

 Lieven, D. (2010). Russia against Napoleon: The True Story of the Campaigns of War and Peace. New York: Penguin Books.
 Zamoyski, A. (2012). 1812: Napoleon’s Fatal March on Moscow. New York: Harper Press.

The Russo-Japanese War

Russia during World War I

Biographies

 Hughes, L. (2008). The Romanovs: Ruling Russia 1613–1917. New York: Bloomsbury
 Lincoln, W. B. (1981). The Romanovs: Autocrats of All the Russias. New York: Doubleday 
 Montefiore, S. (2017). Romanovs: 1613–1918, New York: Vintage.

Peter the Great

 Bushkovitch, P. (2001). Peter the Great: The Struggle for Power, 1671–1725. Cambridge: Cambridge University Press.
 Bushkovitch, P. (2016). Peter the Great. London: Rowman & Littlefield Publishers.
 Hughes, L. (1997). Russia in the Age of Peter the Great. New Haven: Yale University Press.

Catherine the Great

 Alexander, J. T. (1989). Catherine the Great: Life and Legend. New York: Oxford University Press.
 Dixon, S. (2010). Catherine the Great. London: Routledge.
 Madariaga, I. de, (1981). Russia in the Age of Catherine the Great. New Haven: Yale University Press.
 Rounding, V. (2007). Catherine the Great: Love, Sex and Power. London: St Martins Press.
 Zaretsky, R. (2019). Catherine and Diderot: The Empress, the Philosopher, and the Fate of the Enlightenment. Cambridge: Harvard University Press.

Alexander I

 Hartley, J. M. (1994). Alexander I. London: Addison-Wesley Longman.
 Rey, M. P. (2012). Alexander I: The Tsar Who Defeated Napoleon. DeKalb: Northern Illinois University Press.

Nicholas I

 Lincoln, W. B. (1978). Nicholas I: Emperor and Autocrat of All the Russias. DeKalb: Northern Illinois University Press.
 Riasanovsky, N. V. (1959). Nicholas I and Official Nationality in Russia, 1825–1855. Berkeley: University of California Press.

Alexander II

 Almedingen, E. M. (1962). The Emperor Alexander II: A Study. London: Bodley Head.
 Radzinsky, E. (2005). Alexander II: The Last Great Tsar. New York: Free Press.
 Rieber, A. (1971). Alexander II: A Revisionist View. The Journal of Modern History, 43(1), 42–58.

Rasputin

 Fuhrman, J. T. (2012). Rasputin: The Untold Story. Hoboken: Wiley.
 Smith, D. (2016). Rasputin: Faith, Power and the Twilight of the Romanovs. London: Farrar, Straus and Giroux.

Nicholas II

 Frankland, N. (1961). Imperial Tragedy: Nicholas II, Last of the Tsars. New York: Coward-McCann.
 Ferro, M. (1995). Nicholas II: Last of the Tsars. New York: Oxford University Press.
 Lieven, D. (1993). Nicholas II: Emperor of all the Russias. London, UK: John Murray Publishing.
 Massie, R. K. (2012). Nicholas and Alexandra: The Classic Account of the Fall of the Romanov Dynasty. New York: Modern Library.
 Maylunas, A., & Mironenko, S. (2000). Lifelong Passion: Nicholas and Alexandra: Their Own Story. New York: Doubleday.
 Montefiore, S. (2016). The Romanovs: 1613–1918. New York: Knopf.
 Perry, J. C. & Pleshakov, C. V. (1999). The Flight Of The Romanovs: A Family Saga. New York: Basic Books.
 Radzinsky, E. (1992). The Last Tsar: The Life And Death Of Nicholas II. New York: Doubleday.
 Rappaport, H. (2009). The Last Days of the Romanovs: Tragedy at Ekaterinburg. New York: St. Martin's Press.
 Rounding, V. (2012). Alix and Nicky: The Passion of the Last Tsar and Tsarina. London: St Martins Press. 
 Service, R. W. (2017). The Last of the Tsars: Nicholas II and the Russian Revolution. New York: Pegasus Books.

Authors
 Bartlett, R. (2010). Tolstoy: A Russian Life. London: Houghton Mifflin Harcourt.
 Cronin, G. (2021). Disenchanted Wanderer: The Apocalyptic Vision of Konstantin Leontiev. DeKalb: Northern Illinois University Press.
 Frank, J. (2009). Dostoevsky: A Writer in his Time. Princeton: Princeton University Press.
 O’Meara, P. (2016). K.F. Ryleev: A Political Biography of the Decembrist Poet. Princeton: Princeton University Press.

Other
 Alexander, J. T. (1973). Emperor of the Cossacks: Pugachev and the Frontier Jacquerie of 1773–75. Lawrence, KS: Kansas University Press.
 Anisimov, E. V. (1995). Elizabeth: Her Reign and her Russia, 1741–1761. Gulf Breeze, FL: Academic International Press.
 Barratt, G. (1975). The Rebel on the Bridge: A life of the Decembrist Baron Andrey Rozen, 1800–84. Athens, OH: Ohio University Press.
 Batalden, S. K. (1982). Catherine II’s Greek Prelate: Eugenios Voulgaris in Russia 1771–1806. New York: Columbia University Press.
 Byrnes, R. F. (1968). Pobedonostsev: His Life and Thought. Bloomington: Indian University Press.
 Cockfield, J. H. (2002). White Crow: The Life and Times of the Grand Duke Nicholas Mikhailovich Romanov, 1859–1919. Westport: Praeger.
 Crawford, R., & Crawford, D. (1997). Michael and Natasha: The Life and Love of the Last Tsar of Russia. New York: Prentice Hall.
 Curtiss, M. A. (1974). Forgotten Empress: Anna Ivanovna and Her Era. New York: Ungar Publishing Company.
 Fairweather, M. (1997). Pilgrim Princess: A Life of Princess Zinaida Volkonsky. London: Carroll & Graf Publishers.
 Fusso, S. (2017). Editing Turgenev, Dostoevsky, and Tolstoy: Mikhail Katkov and the Great Russian Novel (NIU Series in Slavic, East European, and Eurasian Studies). DeKalb: Northern Illinois University Press.
 Green, A. (2010). Moses Montefiore: Jewish Liberator, Imperial Hero. Cambridge, MA: Harvard University Press.
 Hall, C. (2006). Little Mother of Russia: A Biography of the Empress Marie Feodorovna, 1847–1928. London: Holmes & Meier.
 Hughes, L. (1990). Sophia, Regent of Russia 1654–1704. New Haven: Yale University Press.
 Jenkins, M. (1969). Arakcheev: Grand Vizier of the Russian Empire. New York: Dial Press.
 Josselson, M., & Josselson, D. (1980). The Commander: A Life of Barclay de Tolly. Oxford: Oxford University Press.
 Jones, W. G. (1984). Nikolay Novikov: Enlightener of Russia. Cambridge: Cambridge University Press.
 Longworth, P. (1984). Alexis, Tsar of All the Russias. London: Vintage.
 Longworth, P. (1965). The Art of Victory: The Life and Achievements of Field Marshal Suvorov, 1729–1800. New York: Holt, Rinehart and Winston.
 Longworth, P. (1972). The Three Empresses: Catherine I, Anne, and Elizabeth of Russia. New York: Holt, Rinehart and Winston.
 McGrew, R. E. (1992). Paul I of Russia, 1754–1801. Oxford: Oxford University Press.
 Montefiore, S. (2000). The Prince of Princes: The Life of Potemkin. London: Thomas Dunne Books.
 Ransel, D. L. (2008). A Russian Merchant’s Tale: The Life and Adventures of Ivan Alekseevich Tolchënov, Based on His Diary. Bloomington: Indiana University Press.
 Rappaport, H. (2015). Four Sisters: The Lost Lives of the Romanov Grand Duchesses. London: St. Martin's Press.
 Rhinelander, A. L. H. (1990). Prince Michael Vorontsov: Viceroy to the Tsar. Montreal: Carleton University Press.
 Robinson, P. (2014). Grand Duke Nikolai Nikolaevich: Supreme Commander of the Russian Army. DeKalb: Northern Illinois University Press.
 Sutherland, C. (1984). The Princess of Siberia: The Story of Maria Volkonsky and the Decembrist Exiles. Farrar, Straus and Giroux.
 Van der Kiste, J., & Hall, C. (2013). Once a Grand Duchess: Xenia, Sister of Nicholas II. London: Sutton Publishing.
 Wcislo, F. (2011). Tales of Imperial Russia: The Life and Times of Sergei Witte, 1849–1915. Oxford: Oxford University Press.

Historiography
 Burbank, J. (1993). Revisioning Imperial Russia. Slavic Review, 52(3), 555–567. 
 Confino, M. (2009). The New Russian Historiography, and the Old – Some Considerations. History and Memory, 21(2), 7–33. 
 Karpovich, M. (1943). Klyuchevski and Recent Trends in Russian Historiography. Slavonic and East European Review. American Series, 2(1), 31–39.
 Mazour, A. (1937). Modern Russian Historiography. The Journal of Modern History, 9(2), 169–202. 
 Mogilner, M. (2014). New Imperial History: Post-Soviet historiography in search of a new paradigm for the history of empire and nationalism. Revue d’études Comparatives Est-Ouest, 45(2), 25–67. 
 Sanborn, J. (2013). Russian Historiography on the Origins of the First World War Since the Fischer Controversy. Journal of Contemporary History, 48(2), 350–362.
Memory studies
 Bellows, A. B. (2020). American Slavery and Russian Serfdom in the Post-Emancipation Imagination. Chapel Hill: The University of North Carolina Press.

Identity studies
 Brooks, J. (2010). The Russian Nation Imagined: The Peoples Of Russia As Seen In Popular Imagery, 1860s-1890s. Journal of Social History, 43(3), 535–557.

Primary sourcesA limited number of English language primary sources referred to in the above works. Herzen, A. (1968). My Past and Thoughts: The memoirs of Alexander Herzen (4 vols.) (C. Garnett, Trans.). New York: Knopf.
 Steller, G. W. (2020). Eastbound through Siberia: Observations from the Great Northern Expedition. (Translated and annotated by M. A. Engel and K. E. Willmore). Bloomington: Indiana University Press.

Reference works

Academic journals

Further reading
Many of the above works contain bibliographies. Included below are a selection of works with large bibliographies related to Russian history.
 Lieven, D., Perrie, M., & Suny, R. (Eds.). (2006). The Cambridge History of Russia (3 vols.). Cambridge: Cambridge University Press.

See also
 Bibliography of Russian history (1223–1613)
 Bibliography of the Russo-Japanese War
 Bibliography of Russia during World War I
 Bibliography of the Soviet Union (disambiguation)
 Bibliography of Ukrainian history
 Bibliography of the history of Belarus and Byelorussia
 Bibliography of the history of Poland

References
Notes

Citations

External links
 Everyday life and microhistory in Russia: A selected bibliography of critical studies. Indiana University, Bloomington.
 Janet Martin – Bibliography. (2015). Russian History, 42''(1), 3–8.

 
Bibliography
Bibliography
Bibliography
History (1613–1917)
Russia